Chaenactis lacera is a Mexican species of flowering plants in the aster family. It grows on the Baja California Peninsula in northwestern Mexico, the States of Baja California (sometimes erroneously called Baja California Norte) and Baja California Sur.

Chaenactis lacera is a branching annual sometimes exceeding 30 cm (12 inches) in height. Flower heads are numerous, with white disc florets but no ray florets.

References

External links
El Vizcaíno Biosphere Reserve, Parks Watch

lacera
Endemic flora of Mexico
Flora of Baja California
Flora of Baja California Sur
Plants described in 1912
Taxa named by Edward Lee Greene